Epipremnum nobile is a species of flowering plant belonging to the genus Epipremnum and the family Araceae.

Distribution and habitat
It can be found on the islands Sulawesi and New Britain.

References

nobile